Presidential elections were held in Nigeria on 6 August 1983. The result was a victory for incumbent Shehu Shagari, who won 47.5% of the vote. Shehu Shagaria won his second four-year term as well. His National Party of Nigeria had won the parliamentary elections held later in August.

Results

References

Nigeria
Presidential elections in Nigeria
Election and referendum articles with incomplete results
1983 elections in Nigeria